Broken Hill is a city in the far west of outback New South Wales, Australia. An inland mining city, is near the border with South Australia on the crossing of the Barrier Highway (A32) and the Silver City Highway (B79), in the Barrier Range. It is 315m above sea level, with a hot desert climate, and an average rainfall of 235mm. The closest major city is Adelaide, the capital of South Australia, which is more than 500km to the southwest and linked via route A32.

The town is prominent in Australia's mining, industrial relations and economic history after the discovery of silver ore led to the opening of various mines, thus establishing Broken Hill's recognition as a prosperous mining town well into the 1990s. Despite experiencing a slowing economic situation into the late 1990s and 2000s, Broken Hill itself was listed on the National Heritage List in 2015 and remains Australia's longest running mining town.

Broken Hill, historically considered one of Australia's boomtowns, has been referred to as "The Silver City", and less commonly as the "Oasis of the West", and the "Capital of the Outback". Although over 1100km west of Sydney and surrounded by desert, the town has prominent park and garden displays and offers a number of attractions, such as the Living Desert Sculptures. The town has a high potential for solar power, given its extensive daylight hours of sunshine. The Broken Hill Solar Plant, which was completed in 2015, is one of the largest in the Southern Hemisphere.

In the Broken Hill region the major Aboriginal language groups are the Paakantji, Mayyankapa, and Nyiimpaa.

Time zone
Unlike the rest of New South Wales, Broken Hill (and the surrounding region) observes Australian Central Standard Time (UTC+9:30), the same time zone used in nearby South Australia. This is because at the time the Australian dominions adopted standard time, Broken Hill's only direct rail link was with Adelaide, not Sydney. Similarly, Broken Hill is regarded as part of South Australia for the purposes of postal parcels rates and telephone charges. Broken Hill also used to be a break of gauge station where the state railway systems of South Australia and New South Wales met.

Town name
Broken Hill is Australia's longest-lived mining city. In 1844, the explorer Charles Sturt saw and named the Barrier Range, and at the time referred to a "Broken Hill" in his diary. Silver ore was later discovered on this broken hill in 1883 by boundary rider Charles Rasp. The broken hill that gave its name to Broken Hill actually consisted of a number of hills that appeared to have a break in them. This broken hill no longer exists, having been mined away.

The area was originally known as Willyama.

Geology

Broken Hill's massive orebody, which formed about 1,800 million years ago, has proved to be among the world's largest silver–lead–zinc mineral deposits. The orebody is shaped like a boomerang plunging into the earth at its ends and outcropping in the centre. The protruding tip of the orebody stood out as a jagged rocky ridge amongst undulating plain country on either side. This was known as the broken hill by early pastoralists. Miners called the ore body the Line of Lode. A unique mineral recently identified from Broken Hill has been named Nyholmite after Ron Nyholm (1917–1971). Lead with the isotope signature of the Broken Hill deposits has been found across the entire continent of Antarctica in ice cores dating back to the late nineteenth century.

History
The earliest human settlers in the area around Broken Hill are thought to have been the Wiljakali Indigenous Australians, once thought to have only intermittently lived in the area because of the lack of permanent water sources.

The first Europeans to visit the area was then Surveyor General of New South Wales, Major Thomas Mitchell, in 1841. Three years later in 1844, the explorer Charles Sturt saw and named the Barrier Range while searching for an inland sea; so naming it because it was blocked to his journey north. Burke and Wills passed through the area on their famous 1860–61 expedition, setting up a base camp at nearby Menindee. Pastoralists first began settling the area in the 1850s, and the main trade route to the area was along the Darling River.

Broken Hill was founded in 1883 by boundary rider Charles Rasp, who patrolled the Mount Gipps fences. In 1883 he discovered what he thought was tin, but the samples proved to be silver and lead. The orebody they came from proved to be the largest and richest of its kind in the world. Rasp and six associates founded the Broken Hill Proprietary Company (BHP), later BHP Billiton, and now BHP again, in 1885 as the Syndicate of Seven. By 1915 BHP had realised that its ore reserves were limited and began to diversify into steel production. Mining at the BHP mines at Broken Hill ceased 28 February 1939. BHP was not the only mining operation at Broken Hill though, and mining continued at the southern and northern ends of the Line of Lode. In the early 20th century, Broken Hill was a centre of mining innovation resulting in a viable froth flotation process. Currently the southern and northern operations are run by Perilya Limited, who plan to open further mines along the Line of Lode.

In 1892 Broken Hill Gaol was built, designed by the Colonial Architect, James Barnet, who also designed the Sydney Museum, among others. Its construction cost £15,000, and was carried out by Dobbee and Son. It opened on 8 November 1892 as a 90-bed facility with five prison wardens and initially holding two female and 19 male prisoners.

The Battle of Broken Hill took place on New Year's Day 1915 when two Afghan men, pushing an ice-cream cart, hoisted a Turkish Flag and fired upon a trainload of people who were headed to a New Years Day picnic. Since Australia was at war at the time with the Ottoman Empire, the men were first thought to be Turkish, but were later identified as being from the British colony of India (modern day Pakistan). They killed four and wounded six, before they were killed by a group of policemen and soldiers. The battle witnessed one of the first shots on Australian soil during World War I.

In 1918, the Italian Ambassador to Australia, Emilio Eles, with the help of the Australian police and the army, organised the roundup of Italian deserters working there as miners, to be forcibly sent back to Italy to fight in the war.

Broken Hill is also known for its input into the formation of the labour movement in Australia, and has a rich trade union history. Some of the most bitter industrial disputes have been fought in Broken Hill in 1892, 1909 and 1919. The last of these led to the formation in 1923 of the Barrier Industrial Council, a group of 18 trade unions, which became one of the most influential organisations in the politics of the city. Like many "outback" towns, Broken Hill was built on precious metals, having once had the world's richest deposits of lead, zinc and silver. Although now depleted somewhat, mining still yields around two million tonnes annually. Some mine tours are available. Sheep farming is now one of the principal industries in the area and there are considerably more sheep than people – almost 2 million Merino sheep.

On 10 January 2007, the Broken Hill City Council was dismissed by the NSW Minister for Local Government following a public inquiry.

Parts of the town received record rainfall totals since records began in 1884, with total exceeding  fell in a 24 hour period on 16 March 2022. The main street resembled a river in the floods that followed resulting in the death of one man.

Heritage listings

Broken Hill has a number of heritage-listed sites, including:
 227 Argent Street: Palace Hotel
 258–260 Argent Street: Broken Hill Post Office
 404–408 Argent Street: Walter Sully Emporium
 Broken Hill railway: Broken Hill railway station
 Buck Street: Broken Hill Mosque
 Cobalt Street: Wesley Uniting Church
 160 Crystal Street: Seppelts Warehouse
 East of corner of Gaffney and Oxide Streets, Proprietary Square: First BHP Offices Chimney Ruin
Hynes Street: 1915 Picnic Train Attack and White Rocks Reserve.
 232 Lane Street: "The Old Convent" St Joseph's Convent
 34 Sulphide Street: Broken Hill Trades Hall
 165 Wolfram Street: Broken Hill Synagogue
 Unnamed road, 20 km out: Day Dream Smelter

Town listings
The town was listed in 2001 as a National Engineering Landmark by Engineers Australia as part of its Engineering Heritage Recognition Program.

In 2015, Broken Hill became the first city in Australia to be included on the National Heritage List.

Infrastructure

Electric power

By the 1920s most of the nine mines on the Line of Lode had their own steam-powered electrical generators to power the surface and underground workings. As Broken Hill is in a desert with little water and virtually no fuel, steam generation was an expensive option. In 1927 a plan for a central power-generating facility was proposed by F. J. Mars, consulting electrical engineer with the Central Mine. The proposed powerhouse would provide electricity and compressed air.
The mines agreed and formed Western New South Wales Electric Power Pty Ltd to construct and operate the plant. The Sulzer diesel-powered plant was completed in 1931. This was one of the earliest examples of the use of diesel power generation in Australia. The plant was enlarged in 1950 to cope with increased demand from the North Mine. At the same time, a new power station run by the Southern Power Corporation (owned by Consolidated Zinc) was erected near the New Broken Hill Consolidated Mine to provide power to the southern end of the Line of Lode. Both stations were connected to a common grid that serviced the mines on the Line of Lode.

A HVDC back-to-back station with a maximum transmission rate of 40 megawatts was built at Broken Hill in 1986, to draw from the National Grid. It consists of 2 static inverters working with a voltage of 8.33 kV. After this station was operational, the two other power stations closed and the equipment was gradually removed from the Central Power Station. The mothballed Southern Power Station, now owned by remnant miner Perilya, still houses five, 9 cylinder, Nordberg marine engines and two Mirrlees V16 marine engines.

In 2010, the Central Power Station (CPS) buildings were handed back to Broken Hill City Council for a proposed re-development as a film studio, due to the perceived need for a facility in Broken Hill by some local people in preparation for the production of Mad Max: Fury Road. The historic machinery was all removed and presumably scrapped and the giant pits that the motors were housed in were filled with concrete to convert the buildings into a warehouse type layout. The Broken Hill City Council has received considerable funding and spent a large amount of money and resources on establishing a film studio in the buildings but as at late 2014 these buildings remain largely empty and unused as the production of Fury Road shifted to Namibia, Africa, following higher than expected rainfall.

Solar power

The high potential for solar power given the extensive daily hours of sunshine in the town led to construction of the 53 MW Broken Hill Solar Plant by AGL Energy. It was funded and supported by the Australian Government and New South Wales Government in a bid to encourage the move away from coal generated power in favour of renewable energy. The plant was completed in 2016 and is one of the largest in Australia.

Compressed Air 
In 2022, a Silver City ESP a pumped air storage facility is proposed for Broken Hill.

Water
Broken Hill has never had a permanent local water supply that meets the town's needs. By 1888 when the town's population had reached 5,000, the state government built a series of small storage tanks.

By the 1890s, mining development had increased to the point that there was a severe water shortage and the mines and the people fought for water. Emergency water supplies were shipped by rail from the Darling River. In 1891, the Stephens Creek Reservoir was completed by a private company. The cost of water was high but not excessive and people were willing to pay because the environment was arid. Another reservoir was built at Umberumberka, however variable rainfall meant supplemental supplies by rail and rationing was still needed.

In 1952, Broken Hill's demands for a permanent water supply were met with the completion of a  pipeline from Menindee. The pipeline could supply  of water per hour. Water storage facilities that are part of the Menindee Lakes Scheme on the Darling River secured the water supply to Broken Hill, making it a relative oasis amid the harsh climate of the Australian outback. High evaporation rates have resulted in the policy of using the local storage for supply before using the pipeline.

In 2004, due to severe drought across much of the Murray Darling Basin Catchment area, the Darling River ceased to flow and the Menindee Lakes dried out. Broken Hill essentially ran out of water, with a muddy sludge coming out of some taps around Christmas time in 2004. The high salt content of the water led to a lot of damage to evaporative air conditioners and rusted out hot water systems at an alarming rate.

Due to the over-extraction of water from the tributaries to the Darling River in the early part of the 21st century, the Menindee pipeline became an insecure supply for the city, in its harsh semi-arid climate. In April 2019, a new New South Wales Government-funded pipeline was commissioned. The pipeline was constructed in a joint venture between John Holland Group, MPC Kinetic Group and TRILITY, running 270 km from Wentworth on the Murray River. There are four pumping stations along the route and a 720 megalitre bulk water storage facility 25 kilometres south of Broken Hill.

Transport

The city's isolation was a problem until the Adelaide narrow gauge railway link was finished in 1888. Since the New South Wales Government would not allow the South Australian Government to build a railway across the border, the last  were built by a private company as the Silverton Tramway. The line was so named because it was originally intended to serve the mining town of Silverton, but by the time the railway reached the town it was already being eclipsed by the newer and bigger mine at Broken Hill. The main purpose of the railway was to transport concentrates and ores from the mines to the smelters and port facilities on the coast at Port Pirie, South Australia. As a backload to Broken Hill it transported supplies, principally coal for boilers at the mines and timber for the timber sets used underground in mining. The Silverton Tramway Company was the most profitable railway company on the Australia Stock Exchange.

The main sidings and locomotive servicing facilities were in Railwaytown, a suburb of Broken Hill, with sidings running to the south and north to serve the mines. The main passenger station was at Sulphide Street.

From the later 1890s, Broken Hill Council campaigned for a tramway to provide public transport around town and to the mines. Eventually the NSW Government decided to build a tramway which was opened on 19 March 1902.  It was run by steam trams transferred from Sydney by sea and then by rail across South Australia. It was a curious operation which after World War I suffered increasingly bad losses until the New South Wales Government closed the system in December 1926. 

The tramway opened in 1891 but closed in 1898 as the smelters moved to Port Pirie. In 1889 the Public Works Committee of the New South Wales Legislative Assembly recommended that the Government take over the line and it subsequently became a narrow gauge part of the New South Wales Government Railways (NSWGR) run under contract by the Silverton Tramway Company.

It was an excursion train on the Silverton Tramway that was fired on by two Afghan immigrants in 1915 (see Battle of Broken Hill).

In 1919, a  rail link from Broken Hill to Menindee was opened to transport water from the Darling River to Broken Hill.  It was built as the first stage in a planned direct route to Sydney. The terminus for the train was at Crystal Street station, some distance from the Silverton Tramway Company's Sulphide Street station. The railway mainly hauled water from the Darling River. The rolling stock all had to be transported by sea to South Australia and the railway was supervised by the superintendent of the Broken Hill Government Tramways.

In November 1927 the direct link to Sydney was completed. In September 1937 the NSWGR placed into service the Silver City Comet, the first air conditioned train in Australia, which ran between Broken Hill and Parkes.

During World War II, land transportation between South Australia and Eastern Australia became important because of the threat posed by submarines and mines to coastal shipping. Extensive transshipment yards were constructed at Broken Hill in 1942 to allow transshipment of munitions. However, the threat was never fully realised.

With the purchase of the Sulphide Corporation by the Zinc Corporation in 1948, the modern Cockle Creek Smelter was constructed south of Newcastle. This started to take lead and zinc concentrates directly from Broken Hill via rail in the 1960s, marking the first major use of the rail link to NSW. This was the well known W44 Concentrate Train.

In 1970 the  gauge railway from Port Pirie to Broken Hill was superseded by a new  gauge line, mostly laid alongside the narrow gauge line. This completed the standard transcontinental gauge line from Sydney to Perth.

Broken Hill railway station is one of the stops of the Indian Pacific passenger service, operated by the Journey Beyond, from Sydney to Perth via Adelaide. The weekly NSW TrainLink Outback Xplorer service was introduced in 1996; it arrives from Sydney on Mondays at 19:10, departing Broken Hill on Tuesdays at 07:45 for the return to Sydney. NSW TrainLink also operates a daily road coach service, departing the Broken Hill Tourist Information Centre at 15:45, connecting at Dubbo with the Central West XPT to Sydney. The return journey arrives daily at 22:45. On 24 June 2019, NSW TrainLink introduced a twice weekly coach service to Adelaide.

Regional Express operates air services from Broken Hill Airport to and from Adelaide, Dubbo, Griffith, Melbourne via Mildura and Sydney. Silver City Scenic Flights provide local scenic flights over the city, longer air safaris to various destinations in outback Australia and also private air charter services from Broken Hill Airport.

Local public transport is provided by CDC Broken Hill, operating four city bus routes from Monday to Saturday. The city is also serviced by two urban taxi companies.

Climate
Broken Hill has a hot desert climate (BWh) under the Köppen climate classification. Winters in Broken Hill are relatively mild and dry, although the night and early morning can be cold with moderate frost, while summers are highly variable – mostly hot and dry with some variation (summer storms with high humidity are not uncommon). Broken Hill averages 157.3 clear days per year. Dust storms are a common problem in the desert, but in the late 1930s the people of Broken Hill, led by Mr Keast of the Zinc Corporation mine, created green reserves to surround the town thus protecting it from the worst of the storms.

Demographics 

In 1933, Broken Hill was the third largest urban incorporated area in New South Wales, having a population of 26,925. Broken Hill's population peaked at around 30,000 in the early 1960s and has shrunk by one third since the heyday of the 1970s zinc boom, with the decrease attributed to migration from the closure and consolidation of mining operations.
The estimated urban population of Broken Hill at June 2018 was 17,734. The impact on Broken Hill's economy of the shrinking mining industry and the more efficient mining rates resulted in a higher proportion of part-time employment, higher employment participation rate by females, a general reduction in overall household incomes, and an increase in the average age of the populace as the young leave seeking work. 

In December 2016, Broken Hill had an unemployment rate of 7.9%, which was higher than the state average of 5.1%.

Broken Hill has always had a small indigenous community. In recent decades, the proportion of the population identifying as Aboriginal has increased markedly; from 0.6% in 1971 to 5.1% in 2006, partly owing to the migration of non-indigenous Australians away from Broken Hill. 

In the 19th and early 20th century Broken Hill was home to a community of Afghans. Afghans worked as camel drivers in parts of outback Australia, and they made a significant contribution to economic growth when transport options were limited. The camel drivers formed the first sizeable Muslim communities in Australia, and in Broken Hill they left their mark in the form of the first mosque in New South Wales (1880).

At June 2018 Broken Hill had a population of 17,734. Broken Hill's population was 19,604 in June 2008. The median age is 45; higher than the national average of 38. 8.4% of residents are Aboriginal or Torres Strait Islander; the median age in this group is 22.

86.9% of residents are born in Australia; significantly higher than the national average of 66.7%. The most common other countries of birth are England (0.9%), Philippines (0.7%) and New Zealand (0.4%). The most common reported ancestries in Broken Hill are Australian, English and Irish. 77.9% of residents reported both parents being born in Australia, notably higher than the national average of 47.3%.

The top religious groups in Broken Hill are Catholic 23.1%, Anglican 12.4% and Uniting Church 9.3%. 35.2% stated no religion and 10.1% did not answer the question.

Economy

Broken Hill has been and still is a town dominated by the mining industry, which led to considerable town prosperity in the 19th and 20th century. The mines founded on the Broken Hill Ore Deposit – the world's richest lead-zinc ore body – have until recently provided the majority of direct employment and indirect employment in the city. The Broken Hill Proprietary Company became Australia's largest mining company, and later became part of the world's largest mining company, BHP.

Before the 1940s, mining was done by hand tools with high labor usage rates and included horse-drawn carts underground. The advent of diesel powered mining equipment in the late 1940s and the move toward mechanised underground mining has resulted in less labor used per tonne of ore recovered, and the mine workforce has declined. 

While the low metal prices of the 1990s led to the failure of miner Pasminco, the recent resurgence in metal prices has returned the sole existing operator, Perilya Limited, to profitability and prompted Consolidated Broken Hill Limited to advance development of the untouched Western Lodes and Centenary Lodes. This created over 70 jobs during development and will lead to a second, new, milling operation built within the town. 

Owing to its exposure to the vagaries of the mining industry, and because of a swiftly shrinking population, similar to other rural centres, and compounded by its isolation, Broken Hill has encouraged its widespread artistic credentials  and is promoting itself as a tourism destination to become less reliant upon mining as a source of employment.

Average incomes in Broken Hill are lower than the national average. According to the 2016 Australian Census the median weekly household income in the city was $968; considerably lower than the national average of $1,438.

Culture

Broken Hill and the surrounding area has many natural and man-made attractions on offer for the tourist. These include mining operations (some open to the public), a visitor's centre and lookout on top of the original Line of Lode mine, historic buildings, town history walking trails, many resident artists and galleries, the Sculpture Symposium, COBB & Co coach & wagon rides, Silverton Camel Farm, Stephen's Creek, several quarries, lakes, the Mundi-Mundi plains, and sunsets. The Albert Kersten Mining and Minerals Museum, located on Bromide Street and Crystal Lane, explores the mining history of the town through geology exhibits.

Broken Hill is a major base for both the Royal Flying Doctor Service of Australia and School of the Air.

The Brushmen of the Bush was a group of artists who formed in Broken Hill in 1973. Members included Pro Hart and Jack Absalom. The Pro Hart Gallery and Sculpture Park contains a large collection of Hart's paintings and sculptures, as well as many artworks of others that he collected during his lifetime. The gallery also features the Rolls-Royce Silver Shadow that he painted in his unique style.

Many clubs exist and are open most nights of the week until late. Establishments catering to both locals and tourists include the Musician's Club and the Barrier Social Democratic Club.

Broken Hill has many literary connections. Crime writer Arthur Upfield developed a nostalgic association with the city after his first visit in 1910, and published The Bachelors of Broken Hill featuring his character Bonaparte. in 1958. Ion L. Idriess wrote the novel "The Silver City" based on the town. Kenneth Cook's 1961 novel Wake in Fright—set in the fictional mining town of Bundanyabba—is a thinly disguised portrait of Broken Hill. Cook based the novel on eccentric ocker characters he befriended in Broken Hill, drawing on their penchant for ritualistic drinking, two-up, hunting and alpha-male mateship. The novel was adapted into a 1971 film of the same name, shot on location in Broken Hill and starring Gary Bond, Donald Pleasence and Broken Hill native Chips Rafferty in his final film role.

More recently, much of Australian novelist Max Barry's 2013 novel Lexicon was set in Broken Hill. Writing celebrating this unique community is featured in “from this Broken Hill”.

Visitors are often fascinated by the houses with corrugated iron walls. Although corrugated iron was widely used as a roofing material throughout Australia, it was not commonly used for walls of houses.

Cheese slaw is a common and popular side dish in Broken Hill, and some residents claim the dish originated in the city.

TV/film production 
Broken Hill and the surrounding town of Silverton have been used as the base of various film productions.

One of the most well known films to heavily feature Broken Hill is The Adventures of Priscilla, Queen of the Desert where various scenes in town and surrounding outback were filmed. 
Mario's Palace, now trading as The Palace Hotel, has the "tack-o-rama" mural featured in The Adventures of Priscilla.

Another well known film to be produced in the surrounds of Broken Hill is Mad Max 2 with principal photography taking place across twelve weeks. Scenes were shot at the Pinnacles as well as the Mundi Mundi Plains. In 2022 filming for Mad Max film Furiosa will take place in Silverton.

Other film and TV productions include:
 Spirits of the Air, Gremlins of the Clouds
 Razorback
 Dirty Deeds
 The Flying Doctors on the Nine Network (1986-1993)
 RFDS: Royal Flying Doctor Service on the Seven Network (2021).

Other films and shows have used Broken Hill for only a few scenes, such as Mission: Impossible II, 800 Words, and Godzilla: Final Wars

Health 

Health effects related to the mining industry were endemic to Broken Hill for many years. In 1895, as many as 1 in 50 miners were estimated to be affected by lead poisoning. As recently as 1991, over 80% of children under 5 years of age had blood lead levels higher than government guidelines.

In the early 1990s an extensive government funded Lead Education program was established and people with children under 5 were able to have free lead testing of their children, homes and gardens to assess lead contamination levels. Any property that had considerably high lead levels in ceiling dust or garden soil was provided with free remediation works to reduce potential exposure to lead dust.

Lead contamination continues to be one of the most serious health concerns, particularly in children in Broken Hill. All infants are required to receive blood tests to examine lead levels. Streets located next to the major mine, including Gaffney, Eyre, and Slag Streets have the unenviable award of being classified as some of the most contaminated residential streets in New South Wales.

Media

The town is served by the local newspaper, the Barrier Daily Truth. Major metropolitan and national newspapers from Adelaide and Sydney are also available in Broken Hill.

Local Radio Stations that are available in the Broken Hill region include:

2DRY FM – 107.7FM – community radio station
Radio 1656 AM – Independent Local Radio
 ABC Local Radio as ABC Broken Hill – 999 AM (Since Broken Hill is on Central Time, ABC Local Radio's national and statewide programming is received from Adelaide instead of Sydney when the Broken Hill studios are not broadcasting local programming.)
 Triple J (ABC) – 102.1 FM
 ABC Radio National – 102.9 FM
 ABC Classic FM – 103.7 FM
 ABC NewsRadio – 104.5 FM
 2BH Commercial Radio – 567 AM
 2HIL Hill FM Commercial Radio – 96.5 FM
Silver City FM 88 – 88 FM
Hype FM – 87.6 FM
Vision Christian Radio – 94.9 FM

The following television channels are available free-to-air in the Broken Hill region.
 ABC which broadcasts the ABC TV, ABC TV Plus/ABC Kids, ABC Me and ABC News channels.
 SBS which broadcasts the SBS, SBS Viceland, SBS Food, SBS World Movies, and SBS WorldWatch channels.
 NITV
 Southern Cross Seven (formerly "Central Television".)
 Southern Cross Ten
 Southern Cross Nine
 10 Peach (first digital multichannel ever launched in Broken Hill.)
 10 Bold
 9Go!
 9Gem
 9Life
 7two
 7mate

Although Broken Hill is in New South Wales, the programming schedules for these channels (excluding the ABC) is the same as those of Nine, Ten and Seven in Adelaide, with local adverts inserted and some variations for coverage of Australian Football League or National Rugby League matches, local and national news and current affairs programs, some lifestyle and light entertainment shows and infomercials. This is because Broken Hill, unlike the rest of New South Wales, is on Central Time.  ABC channels are relayed from Sydney, so all programming is a half-hour earlier than advertised.

Southern Cross GTS/BKN broadcasts Seven Network programming including AFL telecasts and other sporting and major events. Southern Cross Ten broadcasts Network Ten output and some programming from 10 Bold and 10 Peach.

On 31 October 2010, Southern Cross GTS/BKN commenced broadcasting a full-time Channel Nine relay service. This service was initially a relay of TCN Sydney, with local advertising inserted until 2013 when it switched to a relay of NWS Adelaide.

The Seven Central service (unrelated to the original Central GTS/BKN) and Imparja Television are available via satellite and terrestrial transmission in the adjacent areas.

Broken Hill was featured during the second leg of The Amazing Race: Unfinished Business.

Prison
Broken Hill Correctional Centre, the state's fourth-oldest prison still in operation, is located at 109 Gossan Street. It is important to the Far West region, as it allows for imprisonment closer to families who live in the area.

Notable residents 

 Steve Abbott – comedian
 Jack Absalom – (1927–2006) artist
 Troy Andrews – wheelchair basketballer and shooter
 June Bronhill – (born June Mary Gough, 1929–2005) Australian internationally renowned soprano light opera singer and musical theatre performer, whose adopted (stage) surname is a contraction of the name of her hometown
 Stuart Bown – Australian rules footballer
 Chad Bugeja – association footballer
 Trevor Butler – Big Brother Australia 2004 winner
 John Casey – commentator
 Murray Farquhar – 1918–1993) NSW Chief Stipendiary Magistrate (1971–1977)
 Stewart Finlay-McLennan – actor
 "Lord Tim" Grose – (Tim Ian Grosse) heavy metal musician
 Florence May Harding – (1908–1971) artist and teacher
 Pro Hart – (1928–2006) artist
 Ion Idriess – (1889–1979) novelist
 Roy Inwood – Victoria Cross recipient
 Rae Desmond Jones – poet and novelist
 Albert Morris – essayist and naturalist
 Ronald Sydney Nyholm – chemist and teacher
 Corey Page – actor
 Chips Rafferty – actor
 Stephen Rowe – singer-songwriter
 Robin Sellick – commercial photographer
 Richard Thilthorpe Slee – General Manager, BHP Mine
 Dean Solomon – Australian rules footballer
 Brent Staker – Australian rules footballer
 Thelma Thomas – costume designer
 Nikki Visser – model and actor
 Taylor Walker – Australian rules footballer
 Susan Dorothea White – artist
 Edward Emerton Warren – businessman
 David Simmons – Former federal MP for Calare and Minister
 The Kid Laroi - rapper, singer-songwriter
 Isaac Cumming - Australian rules footballer
 Mary Gilmore - poet

See also 

 Broken Hill Women's Memorial
 St Josephs Convent

References

Further reading

 Railed Transport in the Broken Hill District. Singleton, C.C. Australian Railway Historical Society Bulletin, April; May; June; July; August 1962
 Sharing the Lode: The Broken Hill Migrant Story. Broken Hill Migrant Heritage Committee. Migrant Heritage Centre, 2006
  From This Broken Hill "This is a portrait ... of a city and its surrounds. It is a collection of photography, poetry and prose around/about this place.", 2009

External links

 Official Broken Hill Campaign – Discover a lost world
 Official Broken Hill homepage
 Far West Proud | Love where you live!

 
Mining towns in New South Wales
Australian National Heritage List
Recipients of Engineers Australia engineering heritage markers